Brett Charles Voss (born 22 February 1978) is a former Australian rules footballer who played with the Brisbane Lions and the St Kilda Football Club.

He was drafted by the Brisbane Bears as a zone selection in 1995. Voss, now with the Lions, made his debut in 1997 but was delisted at the end of 2000, struggling to gain selection in a successful Brisbane side, and over-shadowed by his older brother, Brownlow Medallist Michael Voss.

The St Kilda Football Club, under the leadership of then coach Malcolm Blight, recruited Voss in the 2001 pre-season draft. His 2001 season with the club was inconsistent, but he played 19 matches and found some confidence. It was in 2002 that Voss came into his own as an AFL footballer. He played almost every match between 2004 and 2006 for the Saints, who played finals in each of those three seasons.

Voss played in St Kilda’s 2004 AFL Wizard Home Loans Cup winning side – St Kilda Football Club’s 2nd AFL Cup Win. 

Voss became known for his courage, and often played well above his height in defence. A feature of his game during 2004 and 2005 was his strong marking in the backline, and Voss was one of the Saints' toughest and most reliable players during his time at the club. Voss won Network Ten's Before The Game 'Tool of the Year' award in 2004.

The 2006 season saw Voss have close to his best year, racking up 350 possessions, 140 marks and kicking 15 goals for the year playing in a new role as a half-forward. He finished 10th in the 2006 B&F.

Voss entered the 2007 season struggling with injury, and was unable to hold a place in the side. There was a perception that he had lost some pace, and Voss did not reach his previous standards in his 11 matches for the year.

After some deliberation at the end of the season, and after consultation with coach Ross Lyon, 29-year-old Voss announced his retirement on 18 September 2007 . 

Brett Voss now plays for the Old Haileyburians Amateur Football Club.
Voss finished his career with 170 games of AFL football in a career that spanned 11 seasons at the elite level.

Voss has a wife of 21 years, Carley, and 3 children. Indiah, Jackson, and Ky.

References 

1978 births
Living people
Brisbane Lions players
St Kilda Football Club players
Morningside Australian Football Club players
People educated at Haileybury (Melbourne)
Australian rules footballers from Queensland
Old Haileyburians Amateur Football Club players